Moulay Aïssa ben Idriss II (Aïssa ben idrīs ben idrīs ben `abd allah ben al-ḥasan) was born in Fez, Morocco in the 9th century. He was the son of Idriss II and the descendant of both Idriss I and his brother Suleyman the sultan of Tlemcen. He was the governor of the region of Salé.

References

Ahmed ibn al-Mubarak al-Lamati, Pure Gold from the Words of Sayyidi Abd al-Aziz al-Dabbagh: Al-Dhabab al-Ibriz min Kalam Sayyidi Abd al-Aziz al-Dabbagh (Basic Texts of Islamic Mysticism), in English.

Paroles d'or : Kitâb al-Ilbrîz
Language : French

Moroccan nobility